The Gymnasium Farmsen (GyFa) is a German high school (see "Gymnasium") in Farmsen-Berne borough of Hamburg, Germany, established in 1956. The school is a bilingual school — some subjects are taught in English. It is a partner school of Minneapolis South High School.

Principals
 Walter Löding 1956–1969
 Uwe Schmidt 1969–1994
 Konny G. Neumann 1994-2011
 Peter Geest since 2011

Awards
In the best school contests, which were initiated by Unicum Abi, the school achieved the following results:
 2005: 1st place in Hamburg,  3rd place in Germany
 2006: 1st place in Hamburg,  5th place in Germany
 2007: 1st place in Hamburg,  8th place in Germany
 2008: 1st place in Hamburg,  7th place in Germany

Notable alumni
 Ingo Egloff, politician
 Wilfried Lemke, manager
 Vince Bahrdt, musician
 Gernot Gricksch, author
 Katja Studt, actress
 Andreas Schlueter, author
 Detlef Gottschalck, politician
 Carsten Frigge, politician
 Stephan Merseburger, journalist, television presenter
 Claus "Bubi the Schmied" Graf-Reinholdt, musician

References

External links 
 Official Site
 Homepage of school's newspaper 

Gymnasiums in Germany
Schools in Hamburg
Buildings and structures in Wandsbek
Educational institutions established in 1956
1956 establishments in Germany